Enpinanga vigens is a moth of the family Sphingidae. It is known from southern Thailand, Malaysia (Peninsular, Sarawak), Indonesia (Sumatra, Java, Kalimantan) and the Philippines.

Description of adults
Adults are strongly sexually dimorphic.

Male
There is a broad, brown, lateral stripe on the upperside of the head and thorax. The forewings have a grey ground colour with greenish scales. The hindwing upperside inner margin is narrow and somewhat lighter than the rest of the wing.

Female
The forewing upperside ground colour is grey-brown, with a dark brown median line. The hindwing upperside is mostly uniform in colour, although the inner margin is paler than the rest of the wing.

References

Macroglossini
Moths described in 1879